The 1985 GWA Mazda Tennis Classic was a men's tennis tournament played on indoor carpet courts in Brisbane, Queensland in Australia that was part of the 1985 Nabisco Grand Prix. It was the third and last edition of the tournament and was held from 7 October through 13 October 1985. First-seeded Paul Annacone won the singles title.

Finals

Singles
 Paul Annacone defeated  Kelly Evernden 6–3, 6–3
 It was Annacone's 2nd singles title of the year and of his career.

Doubles
 Marty Davis /  Brad Drewett defeated  Bud Schultz /  Ben Testerman 6–2, 6–2

References

External links
 ITF tournament edition details

GWA Mazda Tennis Classic
GWA Mazda Tennis Classic, 1985
GWA Mazda Tennis Classic
GWA Mazda Tennis Classic
Sports competitions in Brisbane
Tennis in Queensland